Zach Michael Triner (born January 30, 1991) is an American football long snapper for the Tampa Bay Buccaneers of the National Football League (NFL). He played college football at Assumption.

College career
Triner initially attended Siena College on a lacrosse scholarship. He played in 13 games for the Saints in his freshman season, scoring one goal as the team won the Metro Atlantic Athletic Conference title. He transferred to Assumption College to play football going into his sophomore year. He played three years as a defensive end and long snapper for the Greyhounds, recording 5.5 sacks and 7.5 tackles for loss as a senior.

Professional career
Triner worked out for the New England Patriots shortly after the 2015 NFL Draft, but was not offered a contract or invited to take part in a rookie mini camp. He also worked out for the Jacksonville Jaguars and New York Jets in early 2016 and participated in the Houston Texans post-draft rookie mini camp, although he was not offered a contract by any of the three teams.

New York Jets
Triner signed a futures contract with the New York Jets on January 5, 2017, after working out with the team in December 2016. He was released by the team on May 7, 2017.

Green Bay Packers
Triner was signed to the Green Bay Packers practice squad on December 27, 2017. He signed a reserve/future contract with the team on January 2, 2018, following the end of the season, but was waived at the end of training camp on September 1, 2018.

Tampa Bay Buccaneers
Triner signed a reserve/future contract with the Tampa Bay Buccaneers on January 2, 2019, and made the team out of training camp. He made his NFL debut on September 8, 2019, against the San Francisco 49ers. Triner served as the Buccaneers' long snapper for all 16 games in his first NFL season.

Triner was placed on the reserve/COVID-19 list by the team on December 15, 2020, and activated three days later. Triner played in all 16 regular season games and all four playoff games as the Buccaneers won Super Bowl LV. After the season, Triner was given an exclusive-rights free agent tender by the Buccaneers on March 9, 2021, which he signed on April 8, 2021. On September 13, 2021, he was placed on injured reserve after suffering a hand injury in the season opener. He was activated on November 22.

On March 28, 2022, Triner re-signed with the Buccaneers.

Personal life
Triner worked for three years selling mutual funds for Fidelity Investments, training for football before and after his working hours, until he was signed to the Packers' practice squad.

References

External links
 Assumption Greyhounds bio
 Tampa Bay Buccaneers bio

1991 births
Living people
American football long snappers
Siena Saints men's lacrosse players
Tampa Bay Buccaneers players
Players of American football from Massachusetts
People from Marshfield, Massachusetts
Assumption Greyhounds football players
New York Jets players
Green Bay Packers players